Labdia caroli is a moth of the family Cosmopterigidae. It is endemic to the Dachigam National Park in Jammu and Kashmir, India.

The length of the forewings is ca. 4 mm.

External links

Notes on the Cosmopterigidae (Lepidoptera) of Afghanistan and Jammu & Kashmir, India with descriptions of two new species

Labdia
Moths described in 2008